Brazhkina is a rural locality (a village) in Beloyevskoye Rural Settlement, Kudymkarsky District, Perm Krai, Russia. The population was 60 as of 2010.

Geography 
Brazhkina is located 22 km northwest of Kudymkar (the district's administrative centre) by road. Beloyevo is the nearest rural locality.

References 

Rural localities in Kudymkarsky District